Xylopia emarginata is a species of plant in the Annonaceae family. It is native to Cerrado vegetation in Colombia, Venezuela, Bolivia, and Northern Brazil.

References

elliptica
Endemic flora of Brazil
Flora of the Cerrado